Aruna may refer to:

Religion and mythology
 Aruna (Hinduism), the charioteer of Surya in Hinduism
 Aruna (Hittite mythology), a Hittite sea god
 Aruna Stambha, a monumental religious pillar in Puri, Odisha, India
 Arunachala (red mountain), a shaivite holy site in Tamil Nadu, India

People with family-name Aruna
 Ade Aruna (born 1994), Nigerian player of American football 
 Aladi Aruna (1933–2004), Indian politician 
 D. K. Aruna (fl. 1994), Indian politician
 Poongothai Aladi Aruna (born 1964), Indian politician 
 Quadri Aruna (born 1988), Nigerian table tennis player
 Sanghapali Aruna (born 1979), Indian human rights activist

People with the personal name Aruna
 Aruna (singer) (born 1975), American musician
 Aruna Asaf Ali (1909–1996), Indian educator, activist, and publisher
 Aruna Balraj (fl. from 2006), Indian film actress
 Aruna Biswas (fl. from 1986), Bangladeshi actress
 Aruna Chaudhary (born 1957), Indian politician 
 Aruna Darshana (born 1999), Sri Lankan sprinter
 Aruna De Silva (born 1961), Sri Lankan cricketer 
 Aruna Dharmasena (born 1993), Sri Lankan cricketer
 Aruna Dhathathreyan (fl. 2000s), Indian biophysicist
 Aruna Dindane (born 1980), Ivorian football player
 Aruna Gunawardene (born 1969), Sri Lankan cricketer 
 Aruna Irani (born 1946), Indian actress
 Aruna Jayanthi (fl. 2000s), Indian businesswoman 
 Aruna Kori (born 1973), Indian politician 
 Aruna Kumari Galla (born 1944), Indian politician
 Aruna Lama (1945–1998), Indian singer
 Aruna Mishra (fl. from 2003), female Indian boxer
 Aruna Mohanty (born 1960), Odissi dancer
 Aruna Miller (born 1964), American politician
 Mucherla Aruna (born 1965), Indian actress
 Aruna Raje (born 1946), Indian film director 
 Aruna Ramchandra Dhere (born 1957), Marathi writer 
 Aruna Reddy (born 1995), Indian artistic gymnast
 Aruna Roy (born 1946), Indian political and social activist
 Aruna Sairam (born 1952), Indian classical vocalist
 Aruna Shanbaug (1948–2015), subject of an Indian euthanasia court case 
 Aruna Shields (fl. from 2002), British actress
 Aruna Sundararajan  (fl. from 1982), Indian civil servant
 Aruna Vasudev (born 1936), Indian scholar on Asian cinema

Other uses
 Aruna Mountains, Arunachal Pradesh, India
 2313 Aruna, a minor planet

See also

 Arun (disambiguation)
 Arūnas, a given name
 Anúna, an Irish choral ensemble
 Anura (disambiguation)